Troides oblongomaculatus, the oblong-spotted birdwing, is a birdwing butterfly found in Indonesia and New Guinea.

T. oblongomaculatus is the only Troides species found as far east as New Guinea. It has been assumed that the species originated in the Moluccas and later penetrated into Melanesia. It is a common species, the larva of which feed on Aristolochia tagala.

Subspecies
Nine subspecies are recognized. These are:
T. o. oblongomaculatus (Goeze, 1779) from Seram, Ambon, Saparua, Haruku, Seram Laut, Geser, Nusa Laut, Nusa Is.
T. o. thestius (Staudinger, 1896) from Salaya Is.
T. o. bouruensis (Wallace, 1865) from Buru Is., Sula Mangole
T. o. asartia  (Rothschild, 1908) from Seram Laut Is.
T. o. bandensis Pagenstecher, 1904 from Banda Islands
T. o. hanno Fruhstorfer, 1904 from Gorong Is., Watubela Is., Kasiui Is., Tiffoor
T. o. papuensis (Wallace, 1865) from New Guinea
T. o. ilonae Schäffler, 1999 from Yapen Is.
T. o. cyclop Rumbucher & Schäffler, 2005 from Manipa Is., Kelang Is.

Related species 
Troides oblongomaculatus is a member of the Troides helena species group. The members of this clade are:

Troides helena (Linnaeus, 1758)
Troides oblongomaculatus (Goeze, 1779)
Troides × celebensis (Wallace, 1865)

References

Parsons, M. 1983 Notes on the courtship of Troides oblongomaculatus papuensis (Papilionidae) in Papua New Guinea Journal of the Lepidopterists' Society 37:83-85 pdf
Kurt Rumbucher and Oliver Schäffler, 2005 Part 21, Papilionidae XI. Troides IV. helena-group. in Erich Bauer and Thomas Frankenbach Eds. Butterflies of the World. Keltern : Goecke & Evers

External links

Ngypal Systematics and images

Oblongomaculatus
Lepidoptera of New Guinea
Lepidoptera of Papua New Guinea
Butterflies of Indonesia
Fauna of the Maluku Islands
Butterflies described in 1779